Pamela Rotner Sakamoto is an American historian and writer on Japanese and Japanese American history, best known for her 2016 book Midnight in Broad Daylight.

Biography 
Sakamoto grew up in Swampscott, Massachusetts. She is a Phi Beta Kappa graduate of Amherst College and holds a doctorate from the Fletcher School of Law and Diplomacy at Tufts University. Sakamoto lived in Kyoto and Tokyo for seventeen years and is fluent in Japanese. She works as an expert consultant on Japan-related projects for the United States Holocaust Memorial Museum in Washington, D.C. In 2007, she moved to Honolulu, Hawaii, where she teaches history at Punahou School.

Sakamoto is the author of Japanese Diplomats and Jewish Refugees (1998). This work was among the first English-language works that investigated Japanese diplomat Chiune Sughiara and the role of Japanese diplomacy in saving thousands of Jewish lives on the eve of the Holocaust.

Her book Midnight in Broad Daylight (2016), a true-life story about the Japanese-American Fukuhara family divided by World War II, and the Japanese-American war hero Harry K. Fukuhara, was listed by Kirkus Reviews as one of the best nonfiction books of 2016. This book also touches on the internment of Japanese Americans, life in wartime Japan, the Japanese-American Military Intelligence Service, and the atomic bombing of Hiroshima.

Bibliography 

 Japanese Diplomats and Jewish Refugees (Praeger, 1998)
 Midnight in Broad Daylight: A Japanese American Family Caught Between Two Worlds (HarperCollins, 2016)

References 

American historians
Japanese-American history
Jewish American writers
The Fletcher School at Tufts University alumni
People from Swampscott, Massachusetts
Living people
Year of birth missing (living people)
21st-century American Jews